Louis Segondi (30 November 1879 in Paris – 23 June 1949 in Paris) was a French track and field athlete who competed at the 1900 Summer Olympics in Paris, France. Segondi competed in the 1500 metres. He placed in the bottom third of the nine-man, single-round event.

References

External links

 De Wael, Herman. Herman's Full Olympians: "Athletics 1900". Accessed 18 March 2006.
 
 Louis Segondi's profile at Sports Reference.com

Athletes (track and field) at the 1900 Summer Olympics
Olympic athletes of France
French male middle-distance runners
Athletes from Paris
1879 births
1949 deaths